Ignacio Conti (born 5 November 1977) is a Uruguayan former rugby union player who played as lock or as number eight.

Career
At club level, Conti played for Carrasco Polo Club. His first cap for Uruguay was on 22 September 2002, against Namibia, in Montevideo. He was also part of the 2003 Rugby World Cup Uruguay squad, where he only played the match against Samoa. His last cap for Uruguay was against Scotland A, in Bucharest, on 16 June 2009.

References

External links
Ignacio Conti international statistics

1977 births
Living people
Rugby union players from Montevideo
Uruguayan people of Italian descent
Uruguayan rugby union players
Rugby union locks
Rugby union number eights
Uruguay international rugby union players